Krasnoborsky (masculine), Krasnoborskaya (feminine), or Krasnoborskoye (neuter) may refer to:
Krasnoborsky District, a district of Arkhangelsk Oblast, Russia
Krasnoborsky (rural locality) (Krasnoborskaya, Krasnoborskoye), name of several rural localities in Russia